Ollan Conn Cassell (born October 5, 1937) was an American sprinter in the 1950s and 1960s, winning a gold medal in the men's 4 × 400 m relay at the 1964 Summer Olympics. In his early 30s, Cassell later became the executive director of the Amateur Athletic Union (AAU). 

Cassell was born in Nickelsville, Virginia. He graduated from Appalachia High School in Appalachia, Virginia.

Cassell took up the quarter-mile when attending to University of Houston. In 1962, he won gold medals in the 400 m and 4 × 400 m relay and a silver medal in the 4 × 100 m relay at the World Military Championships. The following year, at the 1963 Pan American Games, Cassell won two gold medals in the relays and was second in 200 m and sixth in 100 m.

At the Tokyo Olympics, Cassell was a semifinalist in 400 m and ran the opening leg in the American 4 × 400 m relay team, which won the gold medal with a new world record of 3:00.7.

After that, he retired from sports and started to work as the track and field administrator of the AAU 1965–1972. He was an Executive Director of the AAU 1970–1980 and Executive Director of USA Track and Field 1980–1997. He also was a founding member of the International Athletics Foundation that was created in 1988 and served as vice-president of the International Amateur Athletics Foundation (IAAF) 1976–1999.

He was elected to the United States National Track and Field Hall of Fame as a contributor in 2006.

References

 Sports Reference

USATF Hall of Fame Bio

1937 births
Living people
People from Scott County, Virginia
American male sprinters
Athletes (track and field) at the 1963 Pan American Games
Athletes (track and field) at the 1964 Summer Olympics
Olympic gold medalists for the United States in track and field
Track and field athletes from Virginia
Houston Cougars men's track and field athletes
University of Houston alumni
University of Indianapolis faculty
Medalists at the 1964 Summer Olympics
Pan American Games gold medalists for the United States
Pan American Games silver medalists for the United States
Pan American Games medalists in athletics (track and field)
Athletics (track and field) administrators
Medalists at the 1963 Pan American Games
20th-century American people